Charles Jonas may refer to:

Charles A. Jonas (1876–1955), congressman from North Carolina
Charles R. Jonas (1904–1988), congressman from North Carolina
Charles Jonas (Wisconsin politician) (1840–1896), Czech journalist then Wisconsin journalist and politician